The Legend of the Octopus is a sports tradition during Detroit Red Wings home playoff games involving dead octopuses thrown onto the ice rink. The origins of the activity go back to the 1952 playoffs, when a National Hockey League team played two best-of-seven series to capture the Stanley Cup.  Having eight arms, the octopus symbolized the number of playoff wins necessary for the Red Wings to win the Stanley Cup. The practice started April 15, 1952, when Pete and Jerry Cusimano, brothers and storeowners in Detroit's Eastern Market, hurled an octopus into the rink of Olympia Stadium. The team swept the Toronto Maple Leafs and Montreal Canadiens en route to winning the championship.

Since 1952, the practice has persisted with each passing year. In one 1995 game, fans threw 36 octopuses, including a specimen weighing . The Red Wings' unofficial mascot is a purple octopus named Al, and during playoff runs, two of these mascots were also hung from the rafters of Joe Louis Arena, symbolizing the 16 wins now needed to take home the Stanley Cup. The practice has become such an accepted part of the team's lore, fans have developed various techniques and "octopus etiquette" for launching the creatures onto the ice.

At the final game at Joe Louis Arena, 35 octopuses were thrown onto the ice.

Events inspired by the octopus 
The octopus tradition has launched several other creature and object tossing moments:

During Game 3 of the 1995 Stanley Cup Finals between the Detroit Red Wings and the New Jersey Devils, Devils fans threw a lobster, a dead fish, and other objects onto the ice.

Nashville Predators fans throw catfish onto their home ice. The first recorded instance occurred on January 26, 1999 during a game between the Detroit Red Wings and the Nashville Predators. It was done in response to the Red Wings' tradition.

In the 2006 Stanley Cup playoffs, during the opening-round series between the Wings and the Edmonton Oilers, an Edmonton radio host suggested throwing Alberta Beef on the ice before the game. Oilers fans continued throwing steaks, even at away games, resulting in several arrests at the away cities.

During Game 4 of the 2007 Stanley Cup Western Conference Semifinals between the Detroit Red Wings and the San Jose Sharks, a Sharks fan threw a 3-foot leopard shark onto the ice at the HP Pavilion at San Jose after the Sharks scored their first goal with 2 minutes left in the first period.

During the 2008 Stanley Cup Finals, in which the Red Wings defeated the Pittsburgh Penguins, seafood wholesalers in Pittsburgh, led by Wholey's Fish Market, began requiring identification from customers who purchased octopuses, refusing to sell to buyers from Michigan. This also took place in the lead up to the 2017 Stanley Cup Finals with markets refusing to sell catfish to Tennessee residents.

In Game 1 of the 2010 Western Conference Quarterfinals between the Detroit Red Wings and the Phoenix Coyotes, a rubber snake was thrown onto the ice after a goal by the Coyotes' Keith Yandle.

In Game 2 of the 2010 Western Conference Semifinals between the Detroit Red Wings and San Jose Sharks, a small shark was tossed onto the ice with an octopus inside its mouth.

In Game 3 of the 2017 Western Conference Finals between the Anaheim Ducks and the Nashville Predators, a Predators fan threw a skinned duck on the ice. 

In Game 1 of the 2017 Stanley Cup Finals between the Pittsburgh Penguins and the Nashville Predators, a fan threw a catfish on the ice in the second period, and was escorted out of the arena.

Twirling ban 
Al Sobotka, the former head ice manager at Little Caesars Arena and one of the two Zamboni drivers, was the person who retrieved the thrown octopuses from the ice. When the Red Wings played at Joe Louis Arena, he was known to twirl an octopus above his head as he walked across the ice rink to the Zamboni entrance. On April 19, 2008, the NHL sent the Red Wings a memo that forbade this and imposed a $10,000 fine for violating the mandate. In an email to the Detroit Free Press, NHL spokesman Frank Brown justified the ban because matter flew off the octopus and got on the ice when Sobotka swung it above his head. In an article describing the effects of the new rule, the Detroit Free Press dubbed the NHL's prohibition as "Octopus-gate". By the beginning of the third round of the 2008 Playoffs, the NHL loosened the ban to allow for the octopus twirling to take place at the Zamboni entrance.

See also
 Al the Octopus
 Detroit Red Wings
 Stanley Cup
 Rat trick

References

History of the Detroit Red Wings
Culture of Detroit
Symbols
Animal welfare